Kebria Kola (also Romanized as Kebrīā Kolā) is a village in Deraz Kola Rural District, Babol Kenar District, Babol County, Mazandaran Province, Iran. At the 2006 census, its population was 1,885, in 570 families.

References 

Populated places in Babol County